Pha Lueat is a village and tambon (sub-district) of Tha Pla District, in Uttaradit Province, Thailand. In 2005 it had a population of 6,865 people. The tambon contains 13 villages.

References

Tambon of Uttaradit province
Populated places in Uttaradit province